Toomevara GAA is a Gaelic Athletic Association club located in the parish of Toomevara in County Tipperary, Ireland.  The club is almost exclusively concerned with hurling.

Honours

Munster Senior Club Hurling Championships: 3
 1993, 2004, 2006
Tipperary Senior Hurling Championships: 22
 1890, 1910, 1912, 1913, 1914, 1918, 1919, 1923, 1930, 1931, 1960, 1992, 1993, 1994, 1998, 1999, 2000, 2001, 2003, 2004, 2006, 2008
 North Tipperary Senior Hurling Championships 33
 1910, 1911, 1912, 1913, 1916, 1917, 1918, 1919, 1922, 1923, 1925, 1926, 1927, 1928, 1929, 1930, 1931, 1946, 1958, 1960, 1961, 1962, 1991, 1994, 1995, 1997, 1999, 2000, 2002, 2003, 2006, 2010, 2011
 Séamus Ó Riain Cups 1
 2017
 Tipperary Intermediate Hurling Championships 1
 1984 
 North Tipperary Intermediate Hurling Championships 3
 1944, 1955, 1984 
 Tipperary Junior A Hurling Championship 2
 1913, 1997
 North Tipperary Junior A Hurling Championships 11
 1910, 1911, 1912, 1958, 1991, 1997, 2007, 2010, 2017, 2018, 2019, 2020, 2022
 Tipperary Junior B Hurling Championship 3
 1995, 2000, 2005
 North Tipperary Junior B Hurling Championship 5 
 1993, 1995, 2000, 2005, 2010
 ‘’’North Tipperary Junior C Hurling Championship’’’ 1 2022
 North Tipperary Junior A Football Championship 3
 1972, 1973, 1982
 Tipperary Under-21 A Hurling Championship 5
 1985, 1986, 1990, 1995, 2005
 North Tipperary Under-21 A Hurling Championship 12 
 1967, 1985, 1986, 1990, 1995, 1996, 1998, 2000, 2001, 2005, 2016, 2018
 Tipperary Minor A Hurling Championship 3
 1986, 1987, 1997
 North Tipperary Minor A Hurling Championship 15
 1932, 1937, 1954, 1956, 1981, 1982, 1985, 1986, 1987, 1993, 1994, 1995, 1996, 1997, 1998
 North Tipperary Minor B Hurling Championship 2
 1979, 2007

Notable players
 Mike Nolan
 Willie Ryan
 David Young
 Benny Dunne
 Tommy Dunne
 Matt Hassett
 John Haugh
 Garrett Howard
 Martin Kennedy (hurler)
 John O'Brien
 Phil Shanahan

References

External links
Official Toomevara GAA Club website

Gaelic games clubs in County Tipperary
Hurling clubs in County Tipperary